The 2002 Denali earthquake occurred at 22:12:41 UTC (1:12 PM Local Time) November 3 with an epicenter 66 km ESE of Denali National Park, Alaska, United States. This 7.9 Mw earthquake was the largest recorded in the United States in 37 years (after the 1965 Rat Islands earthquake). The shock was the strongest ever recorded in the interior of Alaska. Due to the remote location, there were no fatalities and only one injury.

Due to the shallow depth, it was felt at least as far away as Seattle and it generated seiches on bodies of water as far away as Texas and New Orleans, Louisiana. About 20 houseboats were damaged by a seiche on a lake in Washington State.

Tectonic setting
The Denali-Totschunda fault is a major dextral (right lateral) strike-slip system, similar in scale to the San Andreas fault system. In Alaska, moving from east to west, the plate interactions change from a transform boundary between Pacific and North American plates to a collision zone with a microplate, the Yakutat terrane, which is in the process of being accreted to the North American plate, to a destructive boundary along the line of the Aleutian islands. The Denali-Totschunda fault system is one of the structures that accommodate the accretion of the Yakutat terrane.

Earthquake

Foreshock
On October 23, 2002, there was a magnitude 6.7 earthquake located on the Denali fault. Minor avalanches of snow and rockfalls were plenty in the area as a result. Because of its location close to the November 3 event and the fact that it preceded it by only 11 days, this earthquake is regarded as a foreshock. The calculated stress transfer from this foreshock indicates that it brought the Denali fault  closer to failure at the location of the mainshock epicenter.

Mainshock
The rupture then jumped to the main Denali Fault strand propagating for a further  before jumping again onto the Totschunda Fault through a wide and complex transition zone, and then ruptured another  of fault plane. The total surface rupture was ca. .

Three subevents were observed during the event: the first was a  7.2 primarily thrust event along the Susitna Glacier thrust with potential simultaneous Denali fault rupture. The total seismic moment of this earthquake corresponds to a magnitude of  7.9.

There is evidence of local supershear propagation inferred from ground motions along at least  of the rupture.

Aftershocks
Aftershocks primarily manifested in portions of fault where surface rupture was found, and aftershocks were usually limited to very shallow depths. South of Denali, aftershocks match the inferred characteristics of the Susitna Glacier thrust. Many aftershocks were actually on faults nearby that are not known to have ruptured, and may just be accommodating stress changes. On the Denali fault itself, there were fewer and smaller aftershocks than expected, with the largest only being a  5.8 event.

Earthquake damage

Minor damage was reported over a wide area but the only examples of severe damage were on highways that crossed the fault trace and areas that suffered liquefaction, e.g. Northway Airport.  Several bridges were damaged but none so severely that they were closed to traffic.

Due to the general self-sufficiency of those living near the fault rupture, very few lifeline systems were compromised. These people tend to get water from private wells, heat their homes and cook their meals with gas furnaces and stoves, and maintain individual septic systems.

The Trans-Alaska Pipeline System crosses the rupture trace; the pipeline suffered some minor damage to supports. There was no oil spillage, as the pipeline at that location was designed to move laterally along beams to withstand major movement on the Denali Fault. The pipeline was shut down for three days to allow for inspections but was then reopened.

See also
List of earthquakes in 2002
List of earthquakes in Alaska
List of earthquakes in the United States

References

External links
The 2002 Denali Fault earthquake – United States Geological Survey
M 7.9 Denali Fault earthquake of November 3, 2002 – Alaska Earthquake Center

Denali
2002 earthquakes
2002 natural disasters in the United States
2002 in Alaska
Supershear earthquakes